Joris Delle (born 29 March 1990) is a French footballer who plays as a goalkeeper for Belgian club Kortrijk. He is a former French youth international and has served as the number one goalkeeper at under-16, under-17, and under-21 level. Delle was a member of the 2005–06 Metz under-16 team that won the Championnat National des 16 ans.

Club career
Delle was born in Briey, France.

On 23 May 2007, he signed his first professional contract agreeing to a three-year deal with FC Metz. For the 2009–10 season, he was installed as the club's fourth goalkeeper and its first-choice on the amateur team in the Championnat de France amateur 2. Delle appeared in 11 matches as Metz were crowned champions of the league finishing with 107 points. On 20 August 2010, he made his professional debut in a league match against Vannes earning a clean sheet in a 1–0 victory.

On 2 July 2012, Delle joined Ligue 1 club Nice on a four-year deal.

In 2013, Delle was loaned for one season to Belgian Pro League club Cercle Brugge.

On 3 July 2015, Delle signed for RC Lens.

On 3 August 2016, he signed a two-year contract with NEC Nijmegen.

On 6 August 2018, he signed a one-year contract with Feyenoord.

On 24 June 2019, he signed for Orlando Pirates in South Africa on a 3-year deal.
He made his debut for Orlando Pirates in a league match against Chippa United at the Orlando stadium where they won 2–1. He was released by Pirates in October 2020.

On 15 June 2021, he returned to Belgium and signed a two-year contract with Kortrijk.

References

External links
 
 
 
 
 

1990 births
People from Briey
Sportspeople from Meurthe-et-Moselle
Living people
French footballers
France youth international footballers
France under-21 international footballers
Association football goalkeepers
FC Metz players
OGC Nice players
Cercle Brugge K.S.V. players
RC Lens players
NEC Nijmegen players
Feyenoord players
Orlando Pirates F.C. players
K.V. Kortrijk players
Championnat National 2 players
Ligue 2 players
Ligue 1 players
Championnat National 3 players
Belgian Pro League players
Eredivisie players
Eerste Divisie players
South African Premier Division players
French expatriate footballers
Expatriate footballers in Belgium
French expatriate sportspeople in Belgium
Expatriate footballers in the Netherlands
French expatriate sportspeople in the Netherlands
Expatriate soccer players in South Africa
French expatriate sportspeople in South Africa
Footballers from Grand Est